Elizabeth Younger whose married name was Elizabeth Finch (2 September 1699 – 24 November 1762), was an actress and dancer.

Her sister was the singer and actress Margaret Bicknell.  Elizabeth married John Finch, the son of Daniel Finch, 7th Earl of Winchilsea...

References

1699 births
1762 deaths
18th-century English actresses
English stage actresses
English female dancers
18th-century British dancers
Elizabeth